"Smells" is the first episode of British sitcom Bottom. The episode was first transmitted on 17 September 1991.

Synopsis
Richie and Eddie are finding it impossible to attract women and they attempt to pick up women using sex spray supposedly loaded with pheromones.

Plot
One Friday night Richie and Eddie return home from a disappointing night on the pull – Richie's bird lies to him, claiming to be a lesbian, he even waste half hour on two women by prancing up & down, winking clenching his buttocks backwards & forwards to the gents he was going until the pair of women gone off with the other blokes and Eddie's been kicked in the testicles for stuffing a vodka bottle in front of his trousers shouting (Whoo-Hoo! Were you looking for the Eiffel Tower girls?). In a desperate attempt to get a girlfriend, the two write a "lonely hearts" advert for Richie to put in the local paper. After trying several ideas including "Ugly Virgin Desperately Seeks Sex of Any Description", "Hot Young Buck", "Foxy Stoat Seeks Pig", "Foxy Stoat on the Prowl", "Musky Sly Old Foxy Stoat" and finally "Minky Musky Sly Old Stoaty Stoaty Stoat" the two give up. Richie then spots an advert for a revolutionary new sex spray. The next day the pair visit the local sex-shop in order to buy a can each.

That night the pair prepare to go out. Richie uses up his biros drawing on chest hair; however, he has to use a green pen, as he has used all the black pens ink on his legs; while in the bathroom, Eddie shaves his tongue. Eddie attempts to remove Richie's nasal hair (at Richie's request) using a pair of pliers. However he ends up throwing Richie around the room, this in turn leads to a fight between the two, until Richie stops it by saying they should take it out on the 'birds' later. Both apply the sex spray liberally and Richie fantasises about finally "doing it". Eddie slowly becomes inebriated on the spray, after spraying it into his mouth.

The pair then venture to their local pub, "The Lamb and Flag", where Richie attempts to pick up the wife (Harriet Thorpe) of a large man (Clive Mantle). He and Eddie pretend to be insane in order to prevent him from beating them up, but not before Richie has his testicles crushed by the man. They then pursue two young women (Cindy Shelley and Carla Mendonça) sat nearby, who are eager for them to leave. They leave them – in a less than subtle fashion – in order to buy condoms. In the toilet, Richie is punched by the large man.

When the duo return from the toilet, the girls have moved tables in the hope of avoiding them. When Richie confronts them, they claim to be lesbians and leave. Richie is disappointed, but this subsides when he realises a drunken Eddie is now attempting to seduce him, as he has become completely 'drunk' off the sex spray. The episode ends with Richie punching Eddie in the face.

Trivia 
During the beginning of the episode while Eddie is eating lard because he's "Too drunk to cook", the actor Ade Edmondson actually ate real lard. Edmondson's reason for doing so was "You couldn't really fake it could you?".

Recurring themes
This episode introduces a few themes that recur throughout the series: 

  
Lee Cornes makes the first of three appearances as Dick Head, the landlord at "The Lamb and Flag" public house.
 The unseen dogs outside "The Lamb and Flag" attack Eddie and Richie on the way in. In this episode it is explained that they are attracted to the sex spray. However, from this point on, every time they enter the pub they are attacked by the dogs.
 Richie's favourite, and only, pick-up line: "My, what a smashing blouse you have on".

References

External links

1991 British television episodes
Bottom (TV series)
British LGBT-related television episodes